The 2000 Philippine Basketball Association (PBA) rookie draft was an event at which teams drafted players from the amateur ranks. It was held on January 9, 2000, at the Glorietta Activity Center in Makati.

Expansion team Red Bull

In 2000, Red Bull became the tenth member of the PBA. The team were allowed to take six players from their PBL team.

Direct hire

Round 1

Round 2

Round 3

Round 4

Undrafted players signed by PBA team
Barangay Ginebra Kings signed Alex Crisano and Ronald Magtulis from Far Eastern.
Mobiline Phone Pals signed Don Camaso and Gherome Ejercito from Adamson University.
Pop Cola Panthers signed Wynne Arboleda from Manuel Quezon.
Sta. Lucia Realtors signed Chris Tan from La Salle-Manila
Tanduay Rhum Masters signed Rudy Hatfield from Michigan-Dearborn.

Note
*All players are Filipinos until proven otherwise.

References

Philippine Basketball Association draft
draft